WAFX (106.9 MHz, "106.9 The Fox") is a commercial FM radio station licensed to Suffolk, Virginia. It serves the Hampton Roads (Norfolk-Virginia Beach-Newport News) radio market. WAFX is owned and operated by Saga Communications. It airs a classic rock radio format.

WAFX broadcasts in the HD Radio (hybrid) format. Studios and offices are on Greenbrier Circle in Chesapeake. Most FM stations in the market are powered at 50,000 watts or less but WAFX runs at 100,000 watts. It is a Class C FM station, with its transmitter off U.S. Route 258 in Windsor, Virginia. That's just far enough west to be in the Class C zone. Eastern Virginia is in the Class B zone, which limits the effective radiated power of FM stations closer to the coast. WAFX's signal covers most of Southeastern Virginia and Northeastern North Carolina, audible from the suburbs of Richmond, Virginia, to Elizabeth City, North Carolina.

History
 
In 1981, Voice of The People, Inc., received a construction permit from the Federal Communications Commission to construct and operate a new FM broadcast station at Suffolk, Virginia, on the frequency 106.9 MHz. Voice of The People chose WTID for the call sign, which stood for the Tidewater region of Virginia. The station signed on the air in November 1982. WTID aired a Christian radio format. In April 1985, the station was sold to Southern Starr Broadcasting Group, Inc., of Altamonte Springs, Florida.

In 1987, Downs Radio, Inc., acquired WTID. Its call letters were changed to WSKX and it aired a country music format. The KX in the call sign stood for "Kicks." The station struggled against the market's long-time country leader, 100.5 WCMS-FM (now urban adult contemporary WVBW-FM). WSKX left the country format in 1989, becoming classic rock WAFX "The Fox."
 
Radio Ventures, Inc., acquired the station for $10 million in 1990. In 1994, Saga Communications bought WAFX for $4 million. Saga, which already owned album rock 98.7 WNOR-FM, continued WAFX's classic rock format, while moving WNOR-FM to a more current-based, harder-edged active rock sound. As of today, WAFX's music playlist has expanded to playing popular and historic 1990's alternative and grunge into their playlist. meanwhile, their sister station, WNOR, has since moved all their classic and harder songs from the 1970's and 1980's on to WAFX, expanding the music to a total of 4 complete decades of historic and iconic classic rock history.

References

External links
106.9 The Fox Online

1983 establishments in Virginia
Classic rock radio stations in the United States
Radio stations established in 1983
AFX
AFX